Biju Swastya Kalyan Yojana is a universal health coverage scheme launched by Chief Minister of Odisha Naveen Patnaik. The scheme covers around 70 lakhs families. A budget of 250 crore was sanctioned by the state government. Cashless healthcare assistance will be provided. Services:
 Free health services for all in all state government health care facilities starting from Sub center level up to district headquarter hospital level with Swasthiya Mitras deployed at help desk.
Annual health coverage of Rs 5 lakhs per family and 7 lakhs per women members of the family.

A health card that contains detail about members of the household is provided to family having Biju Krushak Kalyan Yojana (BKKY) card. Rastriya Swathya Bima Yojana card is available to families with annual income of 50,000 in rural environments and 60,000 in urban environments.

Program
Biju Swastya Kalyan Yojana is for both Below Poverty Line (BPL) and Above Poverty Line( APL) families. The Ayushman Bharat Yojana covers only Below Poverty Line (BPL) card holders. People will get treatment in premier hospitals outside Odisha. A legal citizen of Odisha living outside the state would also get benefits. More than 1.1 crore patients have benefited from this scheme, Annual income should be 3 lakhs for the treatment of cancer, heart and kidney diseases. All premier hospitals including Tata memorial, CMC vellore and Narayana Hrudalaya are covered in this scheme. A patient referred to a hospital outside Odisha would get conveyance of Rs 2000.

See also
Rashtriya Swasthya Bima Yojana
Pradhan Mantri Suraksha Bima Yojana
 Odisha Government Schemes List

References 

Health insurance in India
Government schemes in Odisha